Silver Mugisha, is a Ugandan civil engineer and corporate executive, who serves as the managing director and chief executive officer of the National Water and Sewerage Corporation (NWSC), since August 2013. Before that, he served as the chief manager responsible for "Institutional Development and External Services" at the NWSC.

Background and education
Mugisha was born in Kantunda Village, Bushenyi District, in the Western Region of Uganda, on 14 September 1968. His father, Federico Ngambagye and mother, Pascazia Baryomurwera Ngambagye, were both alive as of February 2015. After attending primary school locally he attended St. Joseph's Secondary School in the city of Mbarara for his O-Level education, and St. Leo's College, Kyegobe in Fort Portal for his A-Level studies.

He was admitted to Makerere University, Uganda's largest and oldest public university, on a scholarship from the Ugandan government. He graduated with a Bachelor of Science in Civil Engineering degree. He went on to obtain a Master of Science in Sanitary Engineering degree, from the IHE Delft Institute for Water Education, in Delft, Netherlands. He then returned to Makerere where he was awarded a Doctor of Philosophy in Economics and Management.

Career
Mugisha joined NWSC in 1994. In 1997, he became one of the senior engineers at the company. In 2013, he was appointed as managing director and chief executive officer of the company. Over the nearly 30 years he has been at the company, he has gained experience in water utility management, international water policy, water and sewerage research and in advisory services.

In an interview that he gave to ESI-Africa in 2016, Mugisha attributed his success and that of NWSC to several factors, including the prioritization of service, the customer and the welfare of the employee above profit.

Other considerations
Mugisha either now or in the past sits on the boards of several public and private enterprises. He is the current chairperson of the Uganda Business and Technical Examinations Board. He is the current chairperson of the Federation of Uganda Employers, elected in March 2021. His other responsibilities include as the first African Vice President of the International Water Association (IWA). He is the current President of the African Water Association (AFWA) and is the chairman of the governing council of Uganda Technical College, Bushenyi.

See also
 Andrew Kitaka

References

External links
 Website of National Water and Sewerage Corporation, Uganda

1968 births
Living people
Ugandan civil engineers
Makerere University alumni
People from Bushenyi District
IHE Delft Institute for Water Education alumni
People from Western Region, Uganda
People educated at St. Leo's College, Kyegobe